Aytekin is a Turkish masculine given name and surname. Notable people with the name include:

Given name
Aytekin Kotil (1934–1992), Turkish politician
Aytekin Mindan (born 1981), Turkish swimmer
Aytekin Viduşlu (born 1978), Turkish footballer

Surname
Deniz Aytekin (born 1978), German football referee of Turkish descent

Turkish-language surnames
Turkish masculine given names